Felix Georg Pfeifer (9 November 1871, Leipzig – 6 March 1945, Leipzig) was a German sculptor and medallist.

Biography 
He was the third son of six children born to the businessman, Friedrich Eduard Pfeifer. This was followed by a study trip to Rome, where he worked with Eugen Diederichs and his associates. He returned to Leipzig at the start of World War I, working as a freelance sculptor.

Inspired by the literary works of Richard Dehmel, his sculptures often dealt with the subjects of friendship and love. His first major group sculpture, Erste Liebe (First Love) was purchased by the government of Saxony, leading to a series of important commissions.

It  was recast in 1936 for the Bundesgartenschau (horticultural show) and given the title "Beglückende Schönheit" (blissful beauty).

He was also well known for his work as a medallist and was often referred to as "Plaketten-Pfeifer" (Plaques Pfeifer). Most of his medals and reliefs are in the Art Nouveau style, following in the steps of the French medallists, Alexandre Charpentier and Oscar Roty. In addition, he produced designs for furniture and household items.

In 1945, after surviving several bombings, he was killed by a clay model that fell on him in his studio.

References

Further reading 
 Herwig Guratzsch (Hrsg.): Museum der bildenden Künste Leipzig. Katalog der Bildwerke. Köln 1999.
 Alfred E. Otto Paul: Die Kunst im Stillen. Kunstschätze auf Leipziger Friedhöfen. Bde. 1–4, Leipzig 2009–2011.

External links 

 
 Felix Pfeifer @ the Rosengarten Dresden website

German sculptors
German male sculptors
1871 births
1945 deaths
20th-century sculptors
Accidental deaths in Germany